Salisbury Square Historic District is a national historic district located at Salisbury, Chariton County, Missouri. The district encompasses eight contributing buildings in an exclusively residential section of Salisbury. It developed between about 1870 and 1916, and includes representative examples of Queen Anne and Prairie School style architecture. The district reflects a collection of intact Queen Anne houses that remain notable in form and design.

It was listed on the National Register of Historic Places in 2009.

References

Historic districts on the National Register of Historic Places in Missouri
Houses on the National Register of Historic Places in Missouri
Queen Anne architecture in Missouri
Prairie School architecture in Missouri
Buildings and structures in Chariton County, Missouri
National Register of Historic Places in Chariton County, Missouri